Putzke is a surname. Notable people with the surname include:

Holm Putzke (born 1973), German professor for criminal law at the University of Passau
Vanadis Putzke (born 1961), German handball player

See also
Putzke Peak, a peak in the McCuddin Mountains, Marie Byrd Land